Yakup is a Turkish given name for males and is a cognate of Jacob and James. People named Yakup include:

 Yakup Ağa (fl. 1462), Ottoman cavalry knight
 Yakup Bugun (born 1987), Turkish footballer
 Yakup Gör (born 1988), Turkish sport wrestler
 Yakup Kadri Karaosmanoğlu (1889–1974), Turkish novelist
 Yakup Kılıç (born 1986), Turkish boxer
 Yakup Satar (1898–2008), last Turkish veteran of the First World War
 Yakup Sertkaya (born 1978), Turkish footballer
 Yakup Şener (born 1990), Turkish amateur boxer
 Yakup Şevki Subaşı (1876–1939), general of the Ottoman Army and the Turkish Army
 Yakup Taş (1959–2023), Turkish politician
Yakup Yıldız (born 1992), Turkish archer

See also
 Yakub
 Jacob (name)

Turkish masculine given names